Şimdi (Now) is the third studio album by Turkish singer Gülşen. It released by Prestij Müzik in November 2001 and featured the leading single "İhanet" (Betrayal), written by Gülşen, which was about Murat Varol and Gülşen's extramarital affairs during their marriage. The album's production company was affected during the 2001 Turkish economic crisis, and as a result, they produced one music video only for the song "İhanet".

Track listing

Release history

References

Gülşen (singer) albums
2001 albums